Rammuka is a village in Tõstamaa Parish, Pärnu County, in southwestern Estonia. It has a population of 29 (as of 1 January 2011).

Rammuka is bordered by Lake Ermistu to the east and Lake Tõhela to the northeast, Tõhela bog is located between the lakes.

References

External links
Website of Kastna region (Kastna, Ranniku and Rammuka villages) 

Villages in Pärnu County